For the dancer born Gertrude Hayes see Gertrude Hoffmann (dancer)

Gertrude Ellen Hayes (1872–1956) was a British artist known for her etchings, watercolour paintings, and repoussee
metal work. Her etchings often featured architectural scenes of buildings or streets.

Hayes was born in London. She attended the Royal College of Art and was later an instructor at the Rugby School. She married artist Alfred Kedington Morgan and took the married name Gertrude Ellen Morgan.

Hayes was a Prix de Rome scholar. She became the first woman to ever be elected to the Royal Society of Painter-Etchers.
 
Her work is included in the permanent collection of the Auckland Art Gallery.

References

1872 births
1956 deaths
19th-century English women artists
20th-century English women artists
Alumni of the Royal College of Art
Artists from London
British printmakers